Clinton Township is a township in Texas County, in the U.S. state of Missouri.

Clinton Township was erected in 1848, taking its name from DeWitt Clinton.

References

Townships in Missouri
Townships in Texas County, Missouri